Sage Hill may refer to:

Sage Hill School, a private school in Newport Coast, California
Sage Hill, Calgary, a community in Alberta, Canada